The Conception Island National Park is a protected area in the Bahamas. The island lies between Cat Island to the north and Rum Cay to the south. The vegetation consists of mangrove communities, with typical strand vegetation, and the island is visited by green turtles, sea birds and migrating birds.

The park
It is administered by the Bahamas National Trust.

Washington Irving identified Conception Island as the site of one of Christopher Columbus' landfalls during his 1492 voyage, but this early theory was not supported by other historians and writers (either at the time or subsequently), who identified different claimant islands as the site of Columbus's landfall.

Flora and fauna
The island has an extensive area of mangrove-dominated habitat and typical strandline vegetation. It is one of the most important nesting sites for the green sea turtle in the Bahamas and is visited by many migrating birds.

References

National parks of the Bahamas